Ted Healy (born Charles Ernest Lee Nash; October 1, 1896 – December 21, 1937) was an American vaudeville performer, comedian, and actor. Though he is chiefly remembered as the creator of The Three Stooges and the style of slapstick comedy that they later made famous, he had a successful stage and film career of his own and was cited as a formative influence by several later comedy stars.

Early life 
Sources conflict on Healy's precise birth name and birthplace, but according to baptismal records, he was born Ernest (or Earnest) Lea Nash on October 1, 1896, in Kaufman, Texas, to Charles McKinney Nash and Mary Eugenia (McGinty) Nash. He attended Holy Innocents School in Houston before the family, including his elder sister, Elizabeth Marcia Nash (March 7, 1895 – October 31, 1972), who later appeared in two 1930s films in small roles under the stage name Marcia Healy (The Sitter Downers and The Great Ziegfeld), moved to New York in 1908. While in New York, he attended high school at De La Salle Institute. Nash initially intended to become a businessman but eventually decided on the stage.

Show business career
Nash made his first foray into show business in 1912 at the age of 15 when he and childhood friend Moe Howard joined the Annette Kellerman Diving Girls, a vaudeville act that included four boys. The act ended quickly after an accident on stage, and Nash and Howard went their separate ways. Nash then developed a vaudeville act and adopted the stage name Ted Healy. Healy's act was a hit, and he soon expanded his role as a comedian and master of ceremonies. In the 1920s, he was the highest-paid performer in vaudeville, making $9000 a week.  He added performers to his stage show, including his new wife, Betty Brown (Betty Braun), and his German shepherd dog.

The Healys' revue toured, listed on the marquee as Syncopated Toes, and when some of his acrobats quit in late 1923, Moe Howard answered the advertisement for replacements. Since Howard was not an acrobat, Healy cast his old friend as a stooge (a purported member of the audience who is picked, ostensibly at random, to come onstage). In the routine, Howard's appearance would end with Healy losing his trousers.

Ted Healy and his Southern Gentlemen 
Howard's brother Shemp joined the act as a heckler in early 1924, but both Howards temporarily left show business in mid 1925. Ted and Betty were hired in June 1925 to star in the Broadway revue Earl Carroll Vanities of 1925. Ted brought some of the routines he developed with the Howard brothers, using three comics under contract to Carroll, (Dave Chasen, Kenneth Lackey, and Lou Warren). After a contract dispute whereby it was determined that Carroll was in the wrong, Ted and Betty left "Vanities" in October 1925 with Lou Warren and relaunched their Syncopated Toes revue, now retitled Fun in the Healy Manner. By January 1926 Shemp Howard had returned, and they successfully toured the country through the summer of 1926. Ted and Betty received another Broadway opportunity, this time from the Shubert Brothers, who hired them for The Passing Show of 1926, with Ted bringing Shemp and Lou along. Passing only enjoyed a preview tour and did not open on Broadway, but the Shuberts and Healy retooled the show into the successful A Night in Spain, with Phil Baker joining the Healys as its stars. For Spain, Ted utilized four stooges in some scenes: Shemp, Lou Warren, brother-in-law Sam "Moody" Braun, and Dick Hakins. Arriving on Broadway in May 1927 after four months of successful previews, Hakins fell ill and was replaced by comedy/specialty dancer Bobby Pinkus. In November 1927, Spain began a national tour with four months at Chicago's 4 Cohans Grand Opera House. Larry Fine, who had been working as the lead performer and house MC at Chicago's Rainbo Gardens nightclub and restaurant, was added to Healy's group of comics in late March 1928.

The Shuberts hired Ted to star in their new show A Night in Venice.  Moe Howard returned to show business and joining Ted at his home in Connecticut to develop some comedy bits for the revue, which began rehearsals in January 1929. Shemp Howard also returned, but Larry Fine was in Atlantic City with his wife, waiting for the birth of his daughter. Healy hired comedy xylophonist Fred Sanborn in Fine's place. Circa mid February, Fine joined the Venice cast.

During the run of A Night in Spain, Ted and Betty performed a song-and-dance stage act in nightclubs and other theaters after the evening show; but the Healys split in 1928. Ted came up with the idea to spotlight his stooges in a new act, with the emphasis on comedy and slapstick humor. Concurrent with their performances in Venice, Healy booked his troupe in additional shows as '"Ted Healy & His Southern Gentlemen" and later as "Ted Healy & His Racketeers". A Night in Venice had a brief road tour after Broadway and closed in March 1930.

Fox Films hired Healy to costar in the film Soup to Nuts (filmed in July 1930), and Ted brought Moe, Shemp, Larry, and Fred Sanborn with him. In late August 1930, the Stooges and Healy parted ways after a dispute over a movie contract. Sanborn began a solo career, and the remaining trio began performing on their own, using such monikers as "The Three Lost Soles" and "Howard, Fine, and Howard," and often incorporated material from previous Healy shows. Healy attempted to sue the Stooges for using his material, but the copyright was held by the Shubert Theatre Corporation, for which the routines had been produced, and the Stooges had the Shuberts' permission to use it.

Healy hired replacement stooges—Eddie Moran (soon replaced by Richard "Dick" Hakins), Jack Wolf (father of sportscaster Warner Wolf), and Paul "Mousie" Garner—in early 1931. This group appeared with Healy in two Broadway plays, The Gang's All Here and Billy Rose's Crazy Quilt.

Moe, Larry, and Shemp rejoined Healy's act in late July 1932, but Shemp left on August 19 to pursue a solo career and was replaced by his younger brother, Curly Howard. The switch from Shemp to Curly happened very quickly, and on August 27, 1932, only eight days after Shemp departed, "Ted Healy with Howard, Fine & Howard" premiered Curly at the RKO Palace in Cleveland, Ohio. The new lineup's personal appearances headlined many of the prime nightclubs and movie palaces nationally for the next several months. In late spring 1933, Ted was contracted by MGM, and the act once more headed to Hollywood, this time to stay. Over the next year, Ted's comedy team appeared in several MGM shorts and even supported stars like Clark Gable and Joan Crawford in theatrical films like Dancing Lady, a blockbuster which featured Healy in an important supporting role as well as Fred Astaire. On his own, Healy was given major roles in MGM features such as Bombshell with Jean Harlow and Operator 13 with Marion Davies and Gary Cooper. In March 1934, Fine and the Howards permanently and more or less amicably parted professional ways with Ted Healy and began working at Columbia Studios as "The Three Stooges."

After the Stooges 
Healy appeared in a succession of films for MGM from 1934 to 1937 and was also loaned to 20th Century-Fox and Warner Bros. for films by those companies, playing both dramatic and comedic roles. One of his films, Mad Holiday (1936), featured stooge Dick Hakins as his sidekick. In San Francisco (1936), a new lineup of "stooges" consisting of Jimmy Brewster, Red Pearson, and Sammy Glasser (Sammy Wolfe) filmed a scene with Healy, but it was omitted from the final release; a few production stills of them survive. Also, in the Technicolor short subject La Fiesta de Santa Barbara (1935), Jimmy Brewster briefly appears to 'stooge' with Healy. During this period, Healy took to wearing a toupée in public. His last film, Hollywood Hotel (1937), was released a few days after he died.

Personal life

Healy's first wife was dancer and singer Betty Brown (born Elizabeth Braun), whom he married in 1922, one week after they met. The couple worked together in vaudeville, then divorced in 1932 after Brown sued socialite Mary Brown Warburton (the granddaughter of business tycoon John Wanamaker) for "alienation of her husband's affections".

Healy's second marriage was to UCLA coed Betty Hickman. After introducing himself, Healy proposed immediately, and the couple became engaged the following day. They were married in Yuma, Arizona, on May 15, 1936, after a midnight elopement by plane. Hickman was granted a divorce on October 7, 1936, which was nullified after a reconciliation. Their son, John Jacob, was born on December 17, 1937, four days before Healy's death.

Death 

Healy died on December 21, 1937, at the age of 41, after an evening of celebration at the Trocadero nightclub on the Sunset Strip in Los Angeles.  He was reportedly celebrating the birth of his son, an event he had eagerly anticipated, according to Moe Howard. "He was nuts about kids", wrote Howard.  "He used to visit our homes and envied the fact that we were all married and had children. Healy always loved kids and often gave Christmas parties for underprivileged youngsters and spent hundreds of dollars on toys."

The circumstances surrounding his death remain a matter of some controversy. An MGM spokesman initially announced the cause as a heart attack, but the presence of recent wounds—a cut over his right eye and a "discolored" left eye—combined with reports of an altercation at the Trocadero gave rise to speculation that he died as a result of those injuries.

Healy's friend, writer Henry Taylor, told Moe Howard that the fight was preceded by an argument between Healy and three men whom he identified as "college fellows". The younger men allegedly knocked Healy to the ground and kicked him in the head, ribs, and abdomen.  The wrestler Man Mountain Dean reported that he was standing in front of the Plaza Hotel in Hollywood at 2:30 a.m. when Healy emerged, bleeding, from a taxi.  He related an "incoherent story" of being attacked at the Trocadero but could not identify his assailant.  Dean contacted a physician, Sydney Weinberg, who treated Healy at the hotel.  Another friend, Joe Frisco, then drove him to his home.  Wyantt LaMont, Healy's personal physician, was summoned to the home the following morning when Healy began experiencing convulsions.  Despite the efforts of LaMont and a cardiologist, John Ruddock, Healy died later that day.  Because of the circumstances, LaMont refused to sign Healy's death certificate.

A later source alleged that the three assailants were not college boys but rather actor Wallace Beery, producer Albert R. Broccoli, and Broccoli's cousin, agent/producer Pat DiCicco. While there is no documentation in contemporaneous news reports that either Beery or DiCicco was present, Broccoli admitted that he was indeed involved in a fist fight with Healy at the Trocadero.  He later modified his story, stating that a heavily intoxicated Healy had picked a fight with him and the two had briefly scuffled and then shook hands and parted ways. In other reports, Broccoli admitted to pushing Healy, but not striking him.

Following an autopsy, the Los Angeles County coroner reported that Healy died of acute toxic nephritis secondary to acute and chronic alcoholism. Police closed their investigation, as there was no indication in the report that his death was caused by physical assault.

Healy was a prodigious spender; despite a weekly salary of $1,700, he died in debt. He indulged in numerous personal luxuries and paid his assistant performers' salaries out of his own pocket. He was also financially generous to friends when they were out of work; for example, while unemployed, Frisco lived at an expensive hotel on Healy's tab. Betty was left responsible for a multitude of liabilities, including hospital bills related to the birth of her son and Healy's medical care. She remained hospitalized for some time after Healy died, leaving their house unattended; as a result, it was burglarized and looted of everything of value.

A trust fund was organized by friends and colleagues to provide financial support for Betty and her child. A fundraiser was also held, including a $10-per-plate dinner and an auction of the Hollywood Hotel's ledger with hundreds of famous signatures, but Betty later asserted that she never received any proceeds from the fundraiser.

Ted Healy is interred at Calvary Cemetery in Los Angeles, California, along with his mother and sister.

Legacy
In the decades that followed, many comedy stars, including Milton Berle, Bob Hope, and Red Skelton, cited Healy as a mentor and significant influence on their careers. "Back in 1925, Ted Healy took me aside and gave me some wonderful advice," Berle told Walter Winchell, in 1955. "'Milton, always play to the public. Never mind playing to the theatrical crowd. Don't try to impress the trumpet player in the pit. Entertain the people and you'll get rich and famous.'" Alex Gard's caricature of Healy was the first of several hundred displayed at Sardi's restaurant in New York City's Theater District.

Filmography

References

Further reading
The Complete Three Stooges: The Official Filmography and Three Stooges Companion by Jon Solomon, (Comedy III Productions, Inc., 2002).
The Three Stooges Scrapbook by Jeff Lenburg, Joan Howard Maurer, Greg Lenburg (Citadel Press, 1994).

External links

 Ted Healy and his Stooges vaudeville routine from Plane Nuts
 
 
 
 Digging though the Hollywood archives

1896 births
1937 deaths
20th-century American male actors
Male actors from Texas
American male film actors
American male comedians
20th-century American comedians
American male screenwriters
American male stage actors
Burials at Calvary Cemetery (Los Angeles)
Deaths from nephritis
Metro-Goldwyn-Mayer contract players
People from Houston
Vaudeville performers
People from Kaufman, Texas
Screenwriters from Texas
20th-century American male writers
20th-century American screenwriters